First Baptist Church is a historic Southern Baptist church on D'Olive Street in Bay Minette, Alabama. It was built in 1914 and added to the National Register of Historic Places in 1988.  The Bay Minette Public Library currently occupies the building.

References

Baptist churches in Alabama
Churches on the National Register of Historic Places in Alabama
Churches completed in 1914
Churches in Baldwin County, Alabama
Public libraries in Alabama
National Register of Historic Places in Baldwin County, Alabama
Southern Baptist Convention churches